Hiromi Live in Concert is a DVD of a concert recorded at the Shinagawa Stellar Ball in Tokyo in December 2005. It features the pianist Hiromi Uehara accompanied by bassist Tony Grey and drummer Martin Valihora.

Track listing

Reception
According to Alex Henderson of Allmusic, "Hiromi has a variety of moods during the concert. Sometimes, she is reflective and impressionistic; other times, she is playful -- and there are also moments of passionate, emotional exuberance." Alongside bassist Tony Grey and drummer Martin Valihora, the trio works cohesively together.

References

Hiromi Uehara albums
2009 live albums
Live video albums
2009 video albums